Legend of the Guardians: The Owls of Ga'Hoole is a 2010 video game adapted for PlayStation 3, Wii and Xbox 360 as well as Nintendo DS. Developed by Krome Studios (Tantalus Media for the Nintendo DS) and published by Warner Bros. Interactive Entertainment, released on September 14, 2010. It is based on the film of the same name, and includes some elements from the books. The game takes place during the events of the movie.

Plot

Introduction 
The story of the game follows the tale of Shard and his friends. The story coincides with the plot of the movie. In the Canyonlands, The Glauxian Monks worshipped the owl god Glaux, hidden away from the hardships of everyday life. Surtr and the Pure Ones had been defeated years ago by Lyze of Kiel and the land had been returned to peace. However, during the watch of a young guard named Grettir, the Monastery was attacked by monstrous, vulture-like birds called Hagsfiends. After losing most of what he knew as his family, he was plagued with guilt, and many others who had heard the story branded him a traitor and a coward. After many years of isolation, Grettir took a mate named Lygeia and had an egg together. On the night that the owlet was to hatch, the nest of Grettir was attacked by a group of vicious owls. They successfully killed Grettir and his mate, but the owlet, now named Shard, survived.

Tutorial 
Shard charges into battle, at the side of Allomere, destroying catapults and defeating hagsfiends. But as the battle continues, Shard gets surrounded by hagsfiends and as they collapse in for the kill, Shard wakes up from his dream and we are introduced to our two main characters, Shard and Parzival. Allomere, a character from the Legends of the Guardians movie is the ryb for both of the students. As Shard takes offense to Parzival insulting his father, it escalates into a fight between the two owls and Allomere gives them flint mops, or work for punishment. Ezylryb asks to take care of the flint mops. The flint mop is to light torches for the Great Tree and just as Shard and Parzival finish their job, the Search and Rescue chaw comes in with a band of owlets, later revealed to be Soren, Gylfie, Twilight and Digger, being attacked by a murder of crows. After Shard and Parvizal clear away the crows, the owlets go to parliament to tell them the story St. Aegolius and what the Pure Ones were doing. The Parliament comes to the decision that Allomere would go to the canyonlands to verify the truth of Soren's claim. After the decision, Ezylryb gives Shard the task of executing secret missions as a Guardian and set off to the Desert Kingdom of Kuneer.

The Desert of Kuneer 
Shard is tasked with finding an eagle named Streak and finding out the cause for the disappearance of young owlets in the area. Shard and Parzival find Streak imprisoned by bats allied with the Pure Ones and free him. Streak becomes Shard's wingman along with Parzival and they go on missions for the rest of the story. Streak reveals that the owlet snatching is true and that the bats are being rewarded for their loyalty by being given some Non-Tyto owlets. Shard and his band go on a mission to find the hideout by destroying bat sanctuaries to make them reveal the location of the hideout. After one of the bats told Streak it was east of the sanctuary to find the secret hideout filled with bats and Pure Ones. After they defeat the defenses of the hideout, reinforcements come to defend the hideout, which guarantees the rumors of the owlets being held there. The group finds some bats still taking owlets from nests and after rescuing them, the group realizes that these problems aren't going to stop unless they take the fight to the bats. After a small attack on the Streak's Nest, the band goes and devises a plan to force the bats out of the hiding places within the compound by forcing them out with fire. The battle becomes more intense as the hideouts are burnt out and the band defeats the defenses. After what seemed like a victory, the enormous Bat Chieftain comes out of hiding to fight with the protagonists. After vanquishing both the Chieftain and what remained of the bats, they free a wandering hermit named Uriah, who tells them that the Pure Ones are working with the bats to gain control of a mysterious substance called flecks. He asks to be part of Shard's band and becomes one of his wingmen and the band returns to the Great Tree to inform them about what was happening in the Desert of Kuneer.

The Forest Kingdom of Tyto 
Shard is tasked with finding the activities of the Pure Ones have in the Forest of Tyto and finding locals who could know what they are doing. Shard and Parzival follow a squadron of Pure Ones who lead them to a prison with resistance fighters locked up in them. Freeing Bryony, the leader of the resistance of Tyto, along with his fellow resistance fighters, the two companions join forces in the group to defend resistance's headquarters, which was under attack by the Pure Ones. After a lengthy battle against Pure Ones, with the resistance's headquarters being destroyed by lightning, Shard and his allies managed to stop forest fire started by their enemies and destroyed Pure Ones' fortress stationed near the area, forcing the survivors to retreat. After the fight, Bryony revealed that while she held captive by the Pure Ones, she overheard the Pure Ones talking about someone they called "the Guardian" and that Shard has a safe trip to the tree. Shard and Parzival parted ways with Bryony and returned to the Great Ga'Hoole Tree and reported about the Guardian.

Glauxian Brothers Retreat 
Later, Ezylryb sent Shard and Parzival and their band to the Glauxian Brothers Retreat to destroy the Pure Ones's primary source of flecks and aiding the brotherhood saving monks from the Hagsfiends, hideous crossbreeds of owls and crows. After they defeated the Hagsfiends, they found an injured hermit named Cormac who helped them rescue monks from the Pure Ones and the Hagsfiends before disposing the fleck pillars, prompting the Hagsfiend Queen to appear and attacked. After defeating the Hagsfiend Queen, Shard learned from Cormac the truth about his father: Instead of betraying Glauxian Monastery, Grettir was actually framed by the real traitor who also masterminded Hagsfiends' attack in the first place from the shadows to dishonor him. After revealing the truth, Cormac passed Grettir's battle claws as a gift of thanks to Shard.

The Beaks 
When Shard and his companions returned to the Great Ga'Hoole Tree, he was dismayed that the Guardians have left to St. Aegolius to confront the Pure Ones without him in the light of confirming Pure Ones' threat. Nevertheless, he rallied his friends Parzival and Uriah to join the fight just as Soren freed the guardians from Pure Ones' forces' fleck traps. Aiding the Guardians destroying the defenses of Stone Palace, Shard soon stumbled upon Allomere who had just escaped the bats' grasp. It is then Allomere revealed himself to be the very traitor who dishonored Grettir long ago, all while confirming that he and the latter were used to be rivals. Allomere further revealed he also masterminded the murder on Grettir and his wife as well as attempting to turn Shard to the Pure Ones when he was an owlet before being interrupted by a bat. Though angered by this revelation, Shard put aside his lust for revenge to help his fellow guardians disabling a giant fleck tower nearby along with Pure One's forge.

As soon as he destroyed the forge however, Shard found himself intercepted by Allomere who lured him to a final battle in the crumbling caverns, vowing that the young Guardian won't escape alive and to finish what he had started long ago. The two owls fought fiercely, culminating with Shard finally defeating Allomere and sending the traitor plunging into the pool below. This, however, doesn't stop the traitor who quickly emerged from the pool and made a final attempt on Shard's life, forcing the young owl to hurl the traitor against nearby rock walls, defeating him and causing some pieces of ceiling to collapse on him, killing him.

Epilogue 
Reporting his success, Shard is disillusioned of his quest. He confides that while he did the right thing, he hasn’t found any closure from it. Ezylryb points out that terrible as war is, it’s worth fighting for Guardian values of truth and fellowship. He then reminds him of the brainwashed owlets at St. Aegolius. Resolved to see the war through, they fly off to continue the fight.

Gameplay 
According to GameSpot, the gameplay is airborne combat. The player locks on to enemy owls or structures, and the player has the option to attack. If the player chooses to do so, the player-controlled owl will "go zooming toward your enemy and wallop it with your claws" as stated in the review. GameSpot also stated that there are some  parts where the player has to navigate through gates in a specific amount of time. The player can choose between four owl species to play as before the game starts, each with its own set of advantages and disadvantages. These include  barn owl, spotted owl, great gray owl, and great horned owl.

Soundtrack 
The original musical soundtrack of the Legend of the Guardians video game was composed by Winifred Phillips and produced by Winnie Waldron. The soundtrack was released on iTunes by WaterTower Music, a division of Warner Bros. Entertainment. The second track on the album, "With Hearts Sublime", is a winner of the 2010 Hollywood Music in Media Award in the category "Best Original Song: Video Game".

Reception 

The Xbox 360, Playstation 3, and Wii versions received mixed reviews, and the DS version received negative reviews. According to Metacritic, the Xbox 360 version has an average critic score of 60 out of 100 based on 13 reviews. While acknowledging its gameplay and other elements as commendable, the majority of critics noted the game's short play time and replay value as a major pitfall. GameSpot gave the Xbox 360 and PlayStation 3 versions a 6/10 rating. Game Informer awarded it 7.25 out of 10 and said "Though limited in scope and complexity, the game does everything it sets out to do and remains a fun family diversion throughout".

References 

2010 video games
Action-adventure games
Fantasy video games
Guardians of Ga'Hoole
Nintendo DS games
Platform games
PlayStation 3 games
Side-scrolling video games
Video games based on films
Krome Studios games
Video games about birds
Video games developed in Australia
Video games scored by Winifred Phillips
Wii games
Xbox 360 games
Warner Bros. video games
Tantalus Media games
Single-player video games
Video games with customizable avatars